The Billboard Global 200 and Global Excl. US are charts that ranks the best-performing singles globally and globally excluding the United States, respectively. Its data is published by Billboard weekly and based collectively on each single's weekly physical and digital sales, as well as streaming. At the end of a year, Billboard publishes an annual list of the 200 most successful songs throughout that year on the Global 200 and Global Excl. US charts based on the information. For 2022, its second year, the list was published on December 2, calculated with data from November 20, 2021, to November 12, 2022.

Year-end list

See also 

 2022 in music
 List of Billboard Global 200 number ones of 2022

References 

United States Hot 100 Year end
Billboard charts